Tequiraca–Canichana is a possible language family proposed in Kaufman (1994) uniting two erstwhile language isolates, Canichana of Bolivia and Tequiraca of Peru, both of which are either extinct or nearly so. The proposal is not included in Campbell (2012).

References

Proposed language families
Indigenous languages of the Americas

Languages of Bolivia
Languages of Peru